Pediapelta aenea is a species of tephritid or fruit flies in the genus Pediapelta of the family Tephritidae.

Distribution
Kenya, Tanzania.

References

Tephritinae
Insects described in 1947
Diptera of Africa